Caina or Cainaxiang (Chinese: 才纳; Pinyin: Cáinà) is a township in Qüxü County, Tibet Autonomous Region of China. Caina is located in the Lhasa River valley, 42 kilometres by road (about an hour's drive ) southwest of Lhasa. The Caina Bridge was built over the Lhasa River in the early 1990s.

See also
List of towns and villages in the Tibet Autonomous Region

References

Populated places in Lhasa (prefecture-level city)
Township-level divisions of Tibet
Qüxü County